Norman S. Radin was a neurochemist who, along with Jim Shayman, developed eliglustat, a drug for treating Gaucher's disease. Born in New York City, he received a B.S. in 1941 and Ph.D. in 1949 from Columbia University, later becoming an associate professor at Northwestern University before moving to the University of Michigan. Norman was a recipient of the National Institutes of Health Javits Neuroscience Investigator Award. He married Norma Levinson on December 23, 1947, in Portland, Oregon and died on January 21, 2013, at his home in Cupertino, California. Norma, professor emeritus of social work at the University of Michigan, died of cancer on September 24, 1998.

References

2013 deaths
People from New York City
American neuroscientists
Year of birth missing
University of Michigan faculty